Marijampolė Municipality is one of 60 municipalities in Lithuania.

Marijampolė has a City Council with  27 members. The members of the City Council represent different Lithuanian political parties.

The Marijampolė Municipality is adjacent to the Vilkaviškis District Municipality in the west, Kazlų Rūda Municipality in the north, Kalvarija Municipality in the south, and the Prienai District Municipality and Alytus District Municipality in the east.

The town of Marijampolė and its 6 surrounding communities make up the territory of Marijampolė Municipality. They are: Gudeliai, Igliauka, Liudvinavas, Marijampolė, Sasnava, and Šunskai communities.

References

Municipalities of Marijampolė County
Municipalities of Lithuania